The January 2018 American West floods occurred due to heavy precipitation in the Western United States. While wildfires in Southern California exacerbated the rain's effects there, other states, like Nevada, also experienced flooding.

Effects
The storm brought much-needed rain to places in the desert like Las Vegas and Phoenix—with the risk of flash floods. Also, mountain snow was expected throughout the area, even into Canada, providing much-needed replenishment to snowpacks.

California
 of snow was reported on Mammoth Mountain.

The heavy rains caused flooding and mudflows in regions burned by recent wildfires, killing at least 23 people.

Nevada
Cities like Las Vegas experienced heavy flooding. Roads and highways underwater lead to road closures. At least two people had to be rescued from a flooded highway in Las Vegas.  of snow were expected in the mountain of southern Nevada, causing winter warnings to be issued.

Oregon and Washington
The Portland area experienced heavy flooding, which interfered with transportation.

See also
 2018 Southern California mudflows
 December 2017 Southern California wildfires

References

2018 in California
2018 floods in the United States
Floods
2018
2018 in Oregon
2018 in Nevada
2018 in Washington (state)